Dance à la Plage was an English alternative/indie band from Oxfordshire, England. The group was composed of Joe Hamilton (vocals, guitar), Harry Elkington (vocals, guitar), Tom Sullivan (bass) and Tom Howard (drums). Active from 2011 to 2017, the band is currently signed to EmuBands. The band released their debut EP, A Short Stay At Clarence Pier in 2012 and released their second and third EPs, "Flying High" and Hope in 2013 and 2014 respectively. They also released their fourth and last EP, "The Last Dance", in 2018.

The band is known to be influenced by the likes of Two Door Cinema Club, Little Comets and The Maccabees. The band's name is French for "dancing at the beach".

Career

2012–2013: A Short Stay At Clarence Pier
Dance à la Plage released their debut EP on Amazon on 25 June 2012. It includes their two singles ‘Matilda’ and ‘Priorities’, which received national airplay on BBC Introducing Oxford, Radio Horton, Banbury Radio and Amazing Radio, garnering praise from critics for their irresistible melodies, quirky lyrics and charismatic performances. The tracks 'She's Gone By The Morning', 'Need to Know' and 'Pink Love' were also featured on the EP.

2013-2014: "Flying High"
Dance à la Plage released their second EP named "Flying High" on 17 June 2013 on Spotify and iTunes. The EP featured the tracks "Electric Concentric", "Fortune" and "Time For Change" featuring singer Frances Mitson.

2014–2016: Hope
Dance à la Plage released their third EP titled "Hope" on 21 April 2014 on iTunes. The EP includes 5 tracks, respectively named Hope, Tightrope, Thank You, Hope (Sunday Afternoon Remix) and the acoustic version of Hope.

2016-2018: 'The Last Dance'
On 28 March 2016 Dance à la Plage released a 31-second teaser trailer of a future song, which later became "Same Direction", saying it was 'coming soon'. On 4 April 2016 Dance à la Plage released their single '222', which later became the lead single from "The Last Dance", on Spotify, Apple Music and ITunes, and was featured on the indie music channel 'IndieAir'. On 23 April 2016 Dance à la Plage announced on Twitter that there was going to be a '222' music video, which ended up being unreleased. On 9 June 2017 Dance à la Plage released their single 'Fever' on all streaming services, alongside a music video which was uploaded on 21 June 2017, on the now-extinct DanceàlaPlageVEVO YouTube channel.

Dance à la Plage announced on 23 August 2017 on Twitter and Facebook that the band had split due to 'other commitments'. It was also announced that the band will still be releasing some unreleased songs in the future.

On 10 November 2017 'Wanna Move Like You' was released on all streaming services, as well as a music video, released on 12 November.

On 13 November 2017 Dance à la Plage announced their final show (on 22 December) via Twitter.

On 22 December 2017 Dance à la Plage played at their last show, thus temporarily ending the band.

However, exactly 6 months after their last show, on 22 June 2018, the band released one of their earlier-recorded songs “Give It Up”, featuring The Haggis Horns.

On 14 September 2018, Dance à la Plage released their fourth and final EP, "The Last Dance", which featured 7 songs: "2 2 2", "Same Direction", "Alright", "Fever", "Give It Up (featuring The Haggis Horns)", "Love Games" and "Wanna Move Like You". Two days later, on 16 September 2018, Dance à la Plage released the music video for "Alright", which was recorded back in 2013, to celebrate band member Joe Hamilton's grandparents being married for 70 years.

In popular culture

The song "Priorities" was featured in the mobile games "Score: World Goals" in 2013 and "First Touch Soccer" in 2015.

The songs "Need to Know" and "She's Gone by The Morning" were featured in the mobile game "Dream League Soccer" in 2015.

Discography
 A Short Stay At Clarence Pier (EP) (2012)
 Flying High (EP) (2013)
 Hope (EP) (2014)
 "The Last Dance (EP)" (2018)

References

English alternative rock groups